Nationality words link to articles with information on the nation's poetry or literature (for instance, Irish or France).

Events
 June 11 – International Poetry Incarnation, a performance poetry event, is staged at the Royal Albert Hall in London before an audience of 7,000, with members of the Beat Generation featuring; Adrian Mitchell reads "To Whom It May Concern"
 Meic Stephens founds Poetry Wales
 Russian poet Anna Akhmatova is allowed to travel outside the Soviet Union to Sicily and England in order to receive the Taormina prize and an honorary doctoral degree from the University of Oxford
 The Belfast Festival at Queen's publishes pamphlets this year and next by some of the members of The Belfast Group of poets, including Seamus Heaney and Michael Longley, which attracts some notice
 In Spain, two new periodical reviews are founded:
Poesía para todos, started by younger Spanish poets and illustrated by renowned painters
Los sesenta, launched by Max Aub and with editors including the poets Jorge Guillén and Rafael Alberti. The second number is published in homage to the Unamuno
 In the British Isles, the centenary of the birth of W. B. Yeats brings forth a number of critical works, prominent among them Thomas Parkinson's book W. B. Yeats: The Later Poetry, and Conor Cruise O'Brien's long essay addressing Yeats' relationship to Fascism, published in In Excited Reverie, edited by A. N. Jeffares and K. G. Cross
 African-American poet Dudley Randall founds Broadside Press in Detroit, which publishes many leading African-American writers
 Paul Éluard's 1926 book of poems, Capitale de la douleur ("Capital of Pain"), influences Jean-Luc Godard's French film Alphaville (released May 5) which has quotations from the book
 The periodical Modern Poetry in Translation is launched by Ted Hughes, Daniel Weissbort and George Theiner in Britain

Works published in English
Listed by nation where the work was first published (and again by the poet's native land, if different); substantially revised works listed separately:

Australia
 Geoffrey Lehmann and Les Murray, The Ilex Tree, Australia
 John Thompson, editor, Australian Poetry, Sydney: Angus & Robertson, 76 pp
 Judith Wright, Preoccupations in Australian Poetry (scholarship), Australia

Canada
 John Glassco, editor, English Poetry in Quebec
 Daryl Hine, The Wooden Horse
 Lionel Kearns, Listen George
 C. F. Klinck and W. H. New, editors, Literary History of Canada, first of four volumes (fourth volume published in 1990, scholarship, Canada
 Irving Layton, Collected Poems
 Tom Marshall, The Beast with Three Backs, Quarry Press
 John Newlove, Moving in Alone, Contact Press
 Al Purdy, The Cariboo Horses, Canada
 Raymond Souster, Ten Elephants on Yonge Street
 Wilfred Watson, Naked Poems
 Phyllis Webb, Naked Poems

India in English
 Dom Moraes John Nobody ( Poetry in English )
 Nissim Ezekiel:
 The Exact Name: Poems 1960–1964 ( Poetry in English ), Calcutta: Writers Workshop, India
 The Unfinished Man, poems written in 1959; ( Poetry in English ), Calcutta: Writers Workshop, India
 P. Lal, "Charge!" They Said ( Poetry in English ), Calcutta: Writers Workshop, India .
 Kamala Das, Summer of Calcutta: Fifty Poems ( Poetry in English ), Delhi: Rajinder Paul
 Roshen Alkazi, Seventeen Poems (see also Seventeen More Poems 1970);  Calcutta: Writers Workshop, India
 Deb Kumar Das, Through A Glass Darkly: Poems ( Poetry in English ), Calcutta: Writers Workshop, India
 T. V. Datareyan, Silver Box and Other Poems ( Poetry in English ), Bombay: Strand
 Vinayaka Krishna Gokak, In Life's Temple ( Poetry in English ), Madras: Blackie and Son
 S. R. Mokashi-Punekar, The Captive ( Poetry in English ), preface by Herbert Read

Ireland
 Denis Devlin, Collected Poems, Dublin: Dolmen Press
 Seamus Heaney, Northern Ireland native Irish poet with books published originally in the United Kingdom:
 Death of a Naturalist
 Eleven Poems, Queen's University
 Richard Murphy, Sailing to an Island, London: Faber and Faber; New York: Chilmark Press, Irish poet with books published originally in the United Kingdom

New Zealand
 Charles Brasch: (year uncertain, but thought to be this year) Twice Sixty, Wellington: Printed at the Wai-te-ata Press (Single poem; broadsheet)
 Charles Doyle, editor, Recent Poetry in New Zealand, anthology
 Kendrick Smithyman, A Way of Saying: A Study of New Zealand Poetry, Auckland & London: Collins, criticism

South Africa
 Patrick Cullinan, North
 Ruth Miller (South African poet), Floating Island, Cape Town 
 David Wright, Adam at Evening, London: Hodder and Stoughton, including "By the Effigy of St. Cecilia"; South African poet with works published originally in the United Kingdom

United Kingdom
 Alan Bold, Society Inebrious
 George Mackay Brown, The Year of the Whale, Scottish poet
 Basil Bunting:
 Loquitur (Fulcrum Press)
 The Spoils (Morden Tower Bookroom)
 Christopher Caudwell, Poems
 Tony Connor, Lodgers London: Oxford University Press London: Chatto and Windus with Hogarth Press
 Donald Davie, The Poems of Doctor Zhivago
 C. Day-Lewis, The Room and Other Poems
 Paul Dehn, The Fern on the Rock: Collected Poems, 1935–1965
 D. J. Enright, The Old Adam, London: Chatto and Windus with Hogarth Press
 Harry Fainlight, Sussicran, London: Turret Books
 Roy Fuller, Buff
 David Gascoyne, Collected Poems
 Robert Graves, Collected Poems (1965 version)
 Michael Hamburger, In Flashlight
 Seamus Heaney, Northern Ireland native published in the United Kingdom:
 Death of a Naturalist
 Eleven Poems, Queen's University
 John Heath-Stubbs, Selected Poems
 George MacBeth, A Doomsday Book, a mix of poems and poem-games, Lowestoft, Suffolk: Scorpion Press
 Norman MacCaig, Measures, London: Chatto and Windus with Hogarth Press
 Richard Murphy, Sailing to an Island, London: Faber and Faber; New York: Chilmark Press, Irish poet
 Sylvia Plath, Ariel, London: Faber and Faber (New York: Harper & Row, 1966), American poet in the United Kingdom
 Kathleen Raine, The Hollow Hill, and Other Poems 1960–4
 Alan Ross, North from Sicily
 Vernon Scannell, Walking Wounded
 Jon Silkin, Nature with Man
 C. H. Sisson, Numbers
 Sir Osbert Sitwell, Poems about People or England Reclaimed (collected from three previous volumes)
 Iain Crichton Smith, The Law and the Grace
 Bernard Spencer, Collected Poems
 Stephen Spender, Selected Poems
 John Wain, Wildtrack, Wildtrack, London: Macmillan
 Ted Walker, Fox on a Barn Door
 Hugo Williams, Symptoms of Loss: Poems, Oxford University Press
 David Wright, Adam at Evening, London: Hodder and Stoughton, including "By the Effigy of St. Cecilia"; South African poet with works published originally in the United Kingdom

Anthologies
 P. L. Brent, editor, Young Commonwealth Poets 1965
 Matthew Hodgart, The Faber Book of Ballads
 I. M. Parsons, Men Who March Away (poems of World War I)
 Robin Skelton, Poetry of the Thirties
 James Reeves, The Cassell Book of English Poetry
 C. V. Wedgwood, editor, New Poems 1965: A PEN Anthology, London: Hutchinson

Criticism and scholarship in the United Kingdom
 Bernard Bergozi, Heroes' Twilight on the literature of World War I
 Anthony Burgess, Here Comes Everybody on the work of James Joyce
 Donald Davie, Ezra Pound: Poet as Sculptor
 Patricia Hutchins, Ezra Pound's Kensington: An Exploration 1885–1913
 Conor Cruise O'Brien, a long essay which addressed W. B. Yeats' relationship to Fascism, published in In Excited Reverie, edited by A. N. Jeffares and K. G. Cross.
 Harold Owen, Journey from Obscurity, Volume III, autobiography by the brother of poet Wilfred Owen, giving "a few interesting glimpses of the poet", according to William Leslie Webb, literary editor of The Guardian
 Thomas Parkinson, W.B. Yeats: The Later Poetry

United States
 A.R. Ammons:
 Corsons Inlet
 Tape for the Turn of the Year
 George Barker, Collected Poems, New York: October House
 Ted Berrigan, Living With Chris
 Elizabeth Bishop, Questions of Travel (Farrar, Straus, and Giroux)
 Hayden Carruth, Nothing for Tigers
 Edgar Bowers, The Astronomers
 Louis Coxe, The Last Hero
 E.E. Cummings, Fairy Tales (posthumous)
 Ed Dorn:
 Idaho Out, Fulcrum Press
 Geography, Fulcrum Press
 Robert Duncan, Roots and Branches
 Paul Engle, A Woman Unashamed
 Jean Garrigue, Country Without Maps, including "Pays Perdu"
 Allen Ginsberg, Jukebox All'Idrogeno, Milan: Arnoldo Mondadori Editore
 Donald Hall, A Roof of Tiger Lilies
 John Hollander, Visions from the Ramble
 Lee Harwood, title illegible (sic) published by Bob Cobbing's Writers Forum
 Paul Horgan, Songs After Lincoln
 David Ignatow, Figures of the Human
 Randall Jarrell:
 Little Friend, Little Friend
 The Lost World, a book of 22 poems, reviewers gave it a mixed reception, New York: Macmillan
 John Knoepfle, Rivers into Islands
 Philip Larkin, The Whitsun Weddings
 Stanley McNail, Something Breathing
 Gabriela Mistral, Selected Poems translated from Spanish
 Samuel French Morse, The Changes
 Howard Moss, Finding Them Lost, New York: Scribners
 Edwin Muir, Collected Poems, New York: Oxford University Press
 Mary Oliver, No Voyage, and Other Poems (expanded from first edition in 1963)
 George Oppen, This in Which
 Sylvia Plath, Ariel, including "Daddy", (posthumous)
 David Ray, X-Rays
 Charles Reznikoff, the first of his Testimony collections
 David Shapiro, January
 Jon Silkin, Nature with Man
 Clark Ashton Smith, Poems in Prose
 Hollis Summers, Seven Occasions
 Melvin Tolson, Harlem Gallery
 Mona Van Duyn, A Time of Bees
 Theodore Weiss, The Medium: New Poems, New York: Macmillan
 Samuel Yellen, New and Selected Poems
 Marya Zaturenska, Collected Poems
 Louis Zukofsky, ALL: The Collected Short Poems, 1923–1958 (Norton)

Criticism and scholarship in the United States
 Theodore Roethke, On the Poet and his Craft (published posthumously)
 Chard Powers Smith, Where the Light Falls, about Edward Arlington Robinson

Other in English
 P. L. Brent, editor, Young Commonwealth Poets 1965 (anthology published in the United Kingdom)
 A. L. Hendriks, On This Mountain (Caribbean)
 Frank Kobina Parkes, Songs from the Wilderness (Ghanaian living in the United Kingdom)
 Derek Walcott, The Castaway (Caribbean)

Works published in other languages
Listed by language and often by nation where the work was first published and again by the poet's native land, if different; substantially revised works listed separately:

Denmark
 Jørgen Gustava Brandt, Etablissementet
 Klaus Rifbjerg, Amagerdigle ("Amager Poems")
 Ivan Malinovski, Poetomatic

Anthologies
 Poul Borum, editor, a volume of modern poetry
 Torben Brostrøm, Den nye poesi, a volume of modern poetry (a new version, first published in 1962)
 Jess Ørnsbo, editor, a volume of modern poetry

Finland
 Pertti Nieminen, Silmissä maailman maismat ("The World in his Eyes"), colorful, humorous fables in the form of poetry
 Arvo Turtainen, translation of Leaves of Grass
 Pentti Saarikoski, Kuljen missä kuljen ("Traveling Man")

French language

Canada
 Jacques Brault, Mémoire
 Paul Chamberland, L'Afficheur hurle
 Gilbert Choquette, L'Honneur de vivre
 Cécile Cloutier, Cuivre et soìes
 Paul-Marie Lapointe, Pour les âmes
 Fernand Oulette, Le Soleil sous la mort

France
 Yves Bonnefoy, Pierre écrite
 Andrée Chedid, Double-Pays
 Roger Giroux, L'Arbre le temps, which won the Max Jacob Prize
 Edmond Jabès, Le Retour au Livre
 Pierre Jean Jouve:
 The "definitive edition" of his poetry
 Ténèbre
 R. Lorno, Légendaire, a book of verses in a style vaguely like Verlaine; the book won the Apollinaire Prize.
 Loys Masson, La Dame de Pavoux
 Saint-John Perse, Pour Dante, Paris: Gallimard
 Marcelin Pleynet, Comme
 Francis Ponge:
 Pour un Malherbe
 Tome Premier
 Robert Sabatier, Les Poisons délectables
 Jean Tortel, Les Villes découvertes

Criticism
 J. P. Richard, Onze Etudes sur la poésie moderne

Switzerland
 Maurice Chappaz, Chant de la Grande Dixence

Hebrew
 N. Alterman, Hagigat Kayitz ("Summer Celebration")
 Yonathan Ratosh, Shirai Memesh ("Poems of Tangibility")
 Mattityahu Shoham, Ketavim ("Writings")
 Moshe Dor, Sirpad Umatehet ("Briar and Metal")
 I. Pincas, Aruhat Erev be-Ferrara ("Supper in Ferrara")
 A. Broides, le-Eretz ha-Moked ("Toward the Blazing Land")

United States
 Moses Feinstein, a book of poems and sonnets
 G. Preil, Mivhar Shirim ("A Selection of Poems"), introduction by A. Shabatay
 Yaffa Eliach, Eishet ha-Dayag ("Fisherman's Wife"), a long, narrative poem
 A. Zeitlin, Hazon ve-Hazon Medinah ("A State and a State Envisioned")

India
Listed in alphabetical order by first name:
 Chandiroor Divakaran, Radha, Malayalam-language
 Nilmani Phookan, Nirjanatar Sabda, Guwahati, Assam: Dutta Barua; Assamese-language
 Nirendranath Chakravarti, Nirokto Korobi, Kolkata: Surabhi Prokashoni; Bengali-language
 Kunwar Narain, Atmajayee, a short epic poem, New Delhi: Bharatiya Jnanpith; Hindi-language
 Umashankar Joshi, Mahaprasthan, a "dialogue-poem"; Gujarati-language

Italy
 Alfredo Giuliani:
 Povera Juliet, a complete collection of his poetry
 editor, Novissimi, a new and enlarged edition of the 1961 anthology-cum-manifesto "increasingly regarded as the principal event in Italian poetry in recent times"
 Roberto Roversi, Dopo Campoformio, collection
 Carlo Villa, Siamo esseri antichi
 Vittorio Sereni, Gli strumenti umani
 Giovanni Giudici, La vita in versi

Portuguese

Brazil
 Carlos Drummond de Andrade, complete works
 Cassiano Ricardo, Jeremias sem chorar
 Mauro Mota, Canto au meio

Criticism
 Cassiano Ricardo, Algumas reflexões sôbre poética de vanguarda

Spanish

Spain
 Ramón Garciasol, Fuente serena
 Diego Jesús Jiménez, La ciudad, winner of the Premio Adonais prize
 José Hierro, El libro de las alucinaciones
 Justo Jorge Padrón, Trazos de un paréntesis

Latin America
 Victor García Robles, Oíd Mortales (Argentina), winner of the Cuban Casa de las Américas Prize in poetry
 J. Bañuelos, O. Oliva, J. A. Shelley, E. Zepeda, and J. Labastida (all in Mexico), Ocupación de la palabra, a collection of their poems
 Carlos Medellín, El aire y las colinas (Colombia)

Criticism
 José Emilio Pacheco, Poesía mexicana del siglo XIX, which Jose Francisco Vazquez-Amaral called (in 1966) "the first reliable work of its kind to deal with that important period of Mexican poetry".

Yiddish
 editor(s) not known, Horizons, a poetry anthology published in the Soviet Union
 Kadye Molodovski, Light from the Thorn Tree
 Berish Vaynshteyn, Destined Poems
 Robert Frost, a volume of his poems in Yiddish (published in Israel), translated by Meyer-Ziml Tkatsh
 L. Olitski, a book of poems (published in Israel)
 A. Shamri, a book of poems (published in Israel)
 M. Yungman, a book of poems (published in Israel)
 Leyzer Aykhenrand, a book of poems (published in Israel)
 Malke Tuzman, a book of poems (published in Israel)

Other
 Dritëro Agolli, Shtigje malesh dhe trotuare ("Mountain paths and sidewalks") (Albania)
 Stratis Haviaras, Βερολίνο ("Berlin", Greece)
 Majken Johansson, Liksom överlämnad (Sweden), her first volume in seven years
 Bengt Emil Johnson, Gubbdrunkning (Sweden)
 Sarah and Rainer Kirsch, Gespräch mit dem Saurier: Gedichte, East Germany
 Luo Fu, Death of a Stone Cell, China (Taiwan)
 Alexander Mezhirov, Ладожский лёд ("Ice of Lake Ladoga"), Russia, Soviet Union
 Boris Pasternak, collected poems published in the Soviet Union, not as complete as the collection published by the University of Michigan in 1961, but the closest to complete available to Soviet readers
 Einar Skjæraasen, "Sang i september" the first poem to appear since 1956 from one of Norway's most popular poets

Awards and honors

Canada
 See 1965 Governor General's Awards for a complete list of winners and finalists for those awards.

United Kingdom
 Eric Gregory Award: John Fuller, Derek Mahon, Michael Longley, Norman Talbot
 Queen's Gold Medal for Poetry: Philip Larkin

United States
 Bollingen Prize: Horace Gregory
 Consultant in Poetry to the Library of Congress (later the post would be called "Poet Laureate Consultant in Poetry to the Library of Congress"): Stephen Spender appointed this year.
 National Book Award for Poetry: Theodore Roethke, The Far Field
 Pulitzer Prize for Poetry: John Berryman: 77 Dream Songs
 Fellowship of the Academy of American Poets: Marianne Moore

Other
 Danish Academy 1965 literature prize: Erik Knudsen, poet and dramatist

Births
 May 30 – Guadalupe Grande (died 2021), Spanish poet
 June 1 – Adeena Karasick, Canadian poet and performance artist
 September 6 – Christopher Nolan (died 2009), Irish poet and author
 November 1 – Kirsten Hammann, Denmark
 November 18 – Michael Crummey, Canadian novelist and poet
 November 23 – Marcel Beyer, German
Also:
 Patience Agbabi, Black English performance poet
 Paul Farley, English poet
 Timothy Liu, American poet
 Jay Ruzesky, Canadian poet
 R. M. Vaughan, Canadian poet and writer
 Tony Walsh, English poet
 Sonja Yelich, New Zealand poet

Deaths
Birth years link to the corresponding "[year] in poetry" article:
 January 4 – T. S. Eliot, 76, American/British poet
 January 28 – Motokichi Takahashi 高橋元吉 (born 1893), Japanese, Taishō and Shōwa period poet
 February 2 – Richard Blackmur, 61, American literary critic and poet
 March 17 – Nancy Cunard, 69, English writer, editor and publisher
 June 5 – Eleanor Farjeon, 84, English poet and author
 June 22 – Piaras Béaslaí, 84, Irish writer and poet
 July 10 – Jacques Audiberti 66, French playwright, poet and novelist and exponent of the Theatre of the Absurd
 August 17:
 Jack Spicer (born 1925), American poet often identified with the San Francisco Renaissance
 Jun Takami 高見順  pen-name of Takama Yoshioa (born 1907), Japanese, Shōwa period novelist and poet
 August 24 – Fuyue Anzai 安西 冬衛 (born 1898) Japanese poet and co-founder of the magazine Shi To Shiron ("Poetry and Poetics")
 October 15 or October 14 – Randall Jarrell, 51, American author, writer and poet, in a highway accident;
 June 22 – Joseph Auslander, 67, American poet, of a heart attack
 September 2 – Johannes Bobrowski (born 1917), East German lyric poet, fiction writer, adaptor and essayist
 November 28 – Aslaug Vaa (born 1889), Norway

See also

 Poetry
 List of poetry awards
 List of years in poetry

Notes

Poetry
20th-century poetry